In linguistics and stylistics, an irreversible binomial, frozen binomial, binomial freeze, binomial expression, binomial pair, or nonreversible word pair is a pair or group of words used together in fixed order as an idiomatic expression or collocation. The words have some semantic relationship and are usually connected by the words and or or. They also belong to the same part of speech: nouns (milk and honey), adjectives (short and sweet), or verbs (do or die). The order of word elements cannot be reversed.

The term "irreversible binomial" was introduced by Yakov Malkiel in 1954, though various aspects of the phenomenon had been discussed since at least 1903 under different names: a "terminological imbroglio". Ernest Gowers used the name Siamese twins (i.e., conjoined twins) in the 1965 edition of Fowler's Modern English Usage. The 2015 edition reverts to the scholarly name, "irreversible binomials", as "Siamese twins" had become offensive.

Many irreversible binomials are catchy due to alliteration, rhyming, or ablaut reduplication, so becoming clichés or catchphrases. Phrases like rock and roll, the birds and the bees, mix and match, and wear and tear have particular meanings apart from or beyond those of their constituent words. Their specific phrasing thus bears the references in the English lexicon: the former two are idioms, whilst the latter two are collocations. Ubiquitous collocations like loud and clear and life or death are fixed expressions, making them a standard part of the vocabulary of native English speakers.

Some English words have become obsolete in general but are still found in an irreversible binomial. For example, spick is a fossil word that never appears outside the phrase spick and span. Some other words, like vim in vim and vigor or abet in aid and abet, have become rare and archaic outside the collocation.

Numerous irreversible binomials are used in legalese. Due to the use of precedent in common law, many lawyers use the same collocations found in legal documents centuries old. Many of these legal doublets contain two synonyms, often one of Old English origin and the other of Latin origin: deposes and says, ways and means.

While many irreversible binomials are literal expressions (like washer and dryer, rest and relaxation, rich and famous, savings and loan), some are entirely figurative (like come hell or high water, nip and tuck, surf and turf) or mostly so (like between a rock and a hard place, five and dime). Somewhat in between are more subtle figures of speech, synecdoches, metaphors, or hyperboles (like cat and mouse, sick and tired, barefoot and pregnant). The terms are often the targets of eggcorns, malapropisms, mondegreens, and folk etymology.

Some irreversible binomials can have minor variations without loss of understanding: time and time again is frequently shortened to time and again; a person who is tarred and feathered (verb) can be said to be covered in tar and feathers (noun).

However, in some cases small changes to wording change the meaning. The accommodating attitude of an activity's participants would be called give and take, while give or take means "approximately". Undertaking some act whether it is right or wrong excludes the insight from knowing the difference between right and wrong; each pair has a subtly differing meaning. And while five and dime is a noun phrase for a low-priced variety store, nickel and dime is a verb phrase for penny-pinching.

Structure 
The words in an irreversible binomial belong to the same part of speech, have some semantic relationship, and are usually connected by and or or. They are often near-synonyms or antonyms, alliterate, or rhyme.

Examples below are split into various tables; some may belong in more than one table but are listed only once.

With opposites and antonyms 

 addition and subtraction
 assets and liabilities
 back and forth
 balls and strikes
 beginning to end
 black and white
 big and small
 boom or bust
 bride and groom
 brother and sister
 butt and pass
 buy and sell
 catch and release
 cause and effect
 church and state
 cops and robbers
 come and go
 coming and going
 cowboys and Indians
 days and nights
 deep and wide
 dos and don'ts
 ebb and flow
 fire and ice
 first and last
 floor to ceiling
 food and drink
 fore and aft
 foreign and domestic
 forward and backward
 friend or foe
 front to back
 fruits and vegetables
 give and take
 good and evil
 hail and farewell
 hand and foot
 head over heels
 Heaven and Hell
 here and there
 hide and seek
 hill and dale
 him and her
 high and low
 hills and valleys
 his and hers
 hither and thither
 hither and yon
 hot and cold
 hurry up and wait
 husband and wife
 in and out
 in the (right/wrong) place at the (right/wrong) time
 ladies and gentlemen
 land and sea
 life or death
 long and short
 lost and found
 love and hate
 love and war
 man and wife
 mom and pop
 naughty or nice
 near and far
 night and day (difference)
 nip and tuck
 north to south
 now and then
 now and later
 on and off
 open and shut
 over and under
 park and ride
 port and starboard
 pros and cons
 push and pull
 rank and file
 rise and fall
 savings and loan
 in sickness and in health
 soap and water
 start to finish
 strike and dip
 sweet and sour
 stop and go
 the quick and the dead
 thick and thin
 (there's) a time and a place
 tip and ring
 to and fro
 top to bottom
 town and country
 up and down
 ups and downs
 uptown and downtown
 war and peace
 washer and dryer
 wax and wane
 yes and no
 yin and yang

With related words and synonyms 

 ages and generations
 aid and comfort
 alas and alack
 bits and pieces
 body and soul
 born and raised/bred
 bright and early
 brick and mortar
 by hook or by crook
 cheek by jowl
 clean and tidy
 chapter and verse
 (it was a) dark and stormy (night)
 (this) day and age
 dollars and cents
 dot the i's and cross the t's
 fear and loathing
 fish and chips
 first and foremost
 hail and farewell
 hand over fist
 haughty and high minded
 head and shoulders
 heart and soul
 herbs and spices
 house and home
 hunger and thirst
 leaps and bounds
 like father, like son
 like mother, like daughter
 lo and behold
 neat and tidy
 six of one,half a dozen of the other
 nickel and dime
 nook and cranny
 null and void
 over and done with
 pain and suffering
 peace and quiet
 pen and ink
 pick and choose
 (on) pins and needles
 plain and simple
 prim and proper
 rant and rave
 rocks and shoals
 shock and awe
 signs and wonders
 skull and bones
 skull and crossbones
 strait and narrow
 straight and narrow
 stress and strain
 swings and roundabouts
 ticks and chiggers
 whine and complain
 wind and rain
 (up) close and personal
 yea and amen

With alliteration 

Also see the English section of the Reduplication article for cases like walkie-talkie, ragtag, chit-chat, hip-hop, bing-bang-boom, etc.

 bag and baggage
 baubles and beads
 beams and balance
 bed and breakfast
 belt and braces
 bench and bar
 big and bad
 the birds and the bees
 bish bash bosh
 black and blue
 bold and beautiful
 bootleggers and Baptists
 boxers or briefs
 bread and butter
 bull and boar
 cash and carry
 chalk and cheese
 cliques and clans
 command and control
 cookies and cream
 deaf and dumb
 (between the) devil and the deep blue sea
 dine and dash
 down and dirty
 dribs and drabs
 drink and drive
 drunk and disorderly
 Dungeons & Dragons
 fast and furious
 feast or famine
 fire and forget
 fire and fury
 fit in or fuck off
 flip-flop
 flora and fauna
 footloose and fancy-free
 forgive and forget
 form and function
 friend or foe
 fun and frolics
 fur and feathers
 ghosts and goblins
 grins and giggles
 guys and gals
 to have and to hold
 hearth and home
 hem and haw
 hoot and holler
 Jew and Gentile
 juking and jiving
 king and country
 kit and caboodle
 kith and kin
 last but not least
 latitude and longitude
 Lend-Lease
 life and limb
 live and learn
 lock and load
 love it or leave it
 mix and match
 meek and mild
 name and number
 part and parcel
 peas in a pod
 pen and pencil
 pen(cil) and paper
 pig in a poke
 pillar to post
 pots and pans
 publish or perish
 rags to riches
 ranting and raving
 read and write
 ready to rumble
 rest and relaxation (R&R/R'n'R)
 (without) rhyme or reason
 right and wrong
 rock and roll
 rough and ready
 rules and regulations
 safe and secure
 safe and sound
 shot and shell
 shower and shave
 signs and symptoms
 slip and slide
 spick and span
 spit and shine
 Stars and Stripes
 sticks and stones
 sugar and spice
 this or that
 ticky-tacky
 tit for tat
 top and tail
 toss and turn
 trick or treat
 trials and tribulations
 tried and tested
 tried and true
 truck and trailer
 wash and wear
 watching and waiting
 weep and wail
 wet and wild
 whooping and hollering
 wild and woolly
 wise and wonderful
 witches and warlocks
 wrack and ruin

With rhymes and similar-sounding words 

 break and take
boom and zoom
 box and cox
 chalk and talk
 charts and darts
 chips and dip
 double trouble
 even Steven
 fair and square
 fender bender
 five and dime
 flotsam and jetsam
 no fuss, no muss
 handy-dandy
 harum-scarum
 helter skelter
 higgledy piggledy
 high and dry
 hire and fire
hit and split
 hit it and quit
 hither and thither
 hocus pocus
 hoity toity
 hot to trot
 huff and puff
 hustle and bustle
 lap and gap
 latest and greatest
 lean, mean, fightin' machine
 lick 'em and stick 'em
 loud and proud
 mean, green, fightin' machine
 meet and greet
 motor voter
 my way or the highway
 namby-pamby
 name and shame
 name it and claim it
 near and dear
 never, ever
 nitty gritty
 odds and sods
 onwards and upwards
 orgy porgy
 out and about
 out and proud
 pell-mell
 pump and dump
 rough and tough
 shout and clout
 saggy baggy
 shake and bake
 slowly but surely
 smoke and joke
 son of a gun
 stash and dash
 stop and drop
 so far, so good
 surf and turf
 time and tide
 town and gown
 use it or lose it
 wake and bake
 wear and tear
 weed and feed
 wham, bam, thank you, ma'am
 willy nilly
 wine and dine
 yea or nay
 (the) yeas and (the) nays

Legal terminology 

In law and official documents, there are many irreversible binomials and triplets consisting of near synonyms, such as the oft-heard terms and conditions and cease and desist. See the Legal doublet article for a list.

Conjunction 
The most common conjunctions in an irreversible binomial are and or or.

With "and" as the conjunction 

 above and beyond
 airs and graces
 alarm and muster
 alive and kicking
 alive and well
 an arm and a leg
 armed and dangerous
 apples and oranges
 back and fill
 back and forth
 bacon and eggs
 bangers and mash
 bait and switch
 bait and tackle
 (old) ball and chain
 barefoot and pregnant
 bargain and sale
 bed and breakfast
 beck and call
 bells and whistles
 belt and suspenders
 big and bold
 big and tall
 bigger and better
 binge and purge
 bit and bridle
 bits and bobs
 bits and pieces
 black and blue 
 block and tackle
 blood and guts
 blood and gore
 bob and weave
 bow and arrow
 bound and determined
 bound and gagged
 bow and scrape
 brace and bit
 bread and water
 bread and circuses
 bread and roses
 brown and serve
 bucket and spade
 bump and grind
 by and large
 by guess and by golly
 cap and gown
 car and driver
 cat and mouse
 checks and balances
 chicken and dumplings
 chop and change
 clean and sober
 cloak and dagger
 coat and tie
 coffee and doughnuts
 cock-and-bull
 crash and burn
 cream and sugar
 crime and punishment
 cup and saucer
 cut and dried (dry)
 cut and paste
 cut and run
 dandelion and burdock
 day and night
 dead and buried
 dead and gone
 death and taxes
 dine and dash
 divide and conquer
 dog and pony show
 down and out
 duck and cover
 duck and dive
 each and every
 eyes and ears
 far and wide
 fast and furious
 fast and loose
 fine and dandy
 fingers and thumbs
 fire and brimstone
 fish and chips
 (by) fits and starts
 flesh and blood
 flesh and bone
 forever and a day
 forever and ever
 front and center
 fun and games
 fuss and bother
 goals and aspirations
 good and plenty
 goodness and light
 hale and hearty
 hard and fast
 ham and eggs
 hammer and nail
 hammer and sickle
 hammer and tongs
 hearts and minds
 here and now
 hide and watch
 high and mighty
 high and dry
 high and tight
 hit and run
 hit it and quit it
 hither and yon
 hither and thither
 home and hosed
 home and dry
 hook and eye
 hook and loop
 horse and buggy
 horse and carriage
 hot and heavy
 hot and high
 hot and bothered
 hugs and kisses (XOXO)
 (for all) intents and purposes
 kippers and custard
 kiss and tell
 kiss and make up
 kith and kin
 knife and fork
 lakes and streams
 last will and testament
 law and order
 lo and behold
 lock and dam
 lock and key
 look and feel
 loud and clear
 make do and mend
 man and boy
 meat and potatoes
 men and women
 milk and honey
 mortise and tenon
 name and address
 names and faces
 nice and easy
 nook and cranny
 noughts and crosses
 nuts and bolts
 odds and ends
 off and away
 once and for all
 out and about
 over and out
 peaches and cream
 Ps and Qs
 peanut butter and jelly
 peas and carrots
 pickles and ice cream
 pick and axe
 piss and moan
 piss and vinegar
 piss and whine
 prim and proper
 prize and booty
 pork and beans
 pure and simple
 quick and dirty
 rack and pinion
 rack and ruin
 raining cats and dogs
 rape and pillage
 research and development (R&D)
 rhythm and blues (R&B)
 rich and famous
 rise and shine
 (between a) rock and a hard place
 room and board
 rough and tumble
 run and jump
 (all's) said and done
 salt and pepper
 scratch and sniff
 search and rescue
 seek and destroy
 (different) shapes and sizes
 shirt and tie
 short and fat
 short and sweet
 short and stout
 show and tell
 shuck and jive
 sick and tired
 slash and burn
 slings and arrows
 slip and fall
 slow and steady
 skin and bone(s)
 smash and grab
 smoke and mirrors
 snakes and ladders
 socks and shoes
 song and dance
 sound and fury
 (in) spirit and (in) truth
 spit and polish
 stand and deliver
 stress and strain
 suave and debonair
 suit and tie
 sunshine and rainbows
 supply and demand
 sweetness and light
 a swing and a miss
 sword and sandal
 tables and chairs
 tall and thin
 tar(red) and feather(ed)
 tar and feathers
 tea and crumpets
 (through) thick and thin
 thunder and lightning
 tits and ass
 to and fro
 tooth and nail
 touch and go
 track and field
 trial and error
 tuck and roll
 up and about
 vim and vigor
 wait and see
 warm and fuzzy
 warp and weft
 wax and wane
 ways and means
 weak and girlish
 well and good
 whinge and whine
 wine and roses
 words and phrases
 X's and O's
 yes and no
 a year and a day

With "or" or "nor" as the conjunction 

 all or nothing
 better or worse
 big or small
 black or white
 business or pleasure
 the chicken or the egg
 day or night
 dead or alive
 do or die
 fight or flight
 (neither) fish nor fowl
 give or take
 good or bad
 gentle or simple
 he or she
 heads or tails
 (come) hell or high water
 (neither) here nor there
 (neither) hide nor hair
 his or her
 hit or miss
 (not one) jot or tittle
 kill or cure
 kill or be killed
 (neither) love nor money
 make or break
 more or less
 now or never
 put up or shut up
 rain or shine
 rhyme or reason
 right or wrong
 sink or swim
 sooner or later
 take it or leave it
 two or more
 up or down
 (neither) use nor ornament
 victory or death
 win or lose
 yes or no

With no conjunction 
 hoity toity
 hunter-gatherer
 corn cheese

People and fictional characters 

 Abbott and Costello
 Adam and Eve
 Antony and Cleopatra
 Ant & Dec
 Batman and Robin
 Bonnie and Clyde
 Cain and Abel
 Cannon and Ball
 Castor and Pollux
 Click and Clack
 Damon and Pythias
 Deleuze and Guattari
 Dick and Jane
 Flanders and Swann
 French and Saunders
 Frick and Frack
 Gilbert and Sullivan
 Hansel and Gretel
 Jacob and Esau
 Jack and Jill
 Jack and Victor
 Laurel and Hardy
 Lennon and McCartney
 Lewis and Clark
 Little and Large
 Martin and Lewis
 Mary-Kate and Ashley Olsen
 Mel and Sue
 Morecambe and Wise
 Mork and Mindy
 Penn & Teller
 Phineas and Ferb
 Pinky & The Brain
 Ren & Stimpy
 Rhett & Link
 Rick and Morty
 Rodgers and Hart
 Rodgers and Hammerstein
 Romeo and Juliet
 Romulus and Remus
 Rosencrantz and Guildenstern
 Sam and Max
 Sonny & Cher
 Thomson and Thompson
 Tom & Jerry
 Tristan and Isolde
 Tim & Eric
 Vic & Bob
 Watson and Crick

Rhyming slang 

 Adam and Eve
 apples and pears
 bottle and glass
 Brahms and Liszt
 dog and bone
 frog and toad
 hand and blister
 north and south
 rabbit and pork
 trouble and strife
 two and eight
 whistle and flute

Variants 
Irreversible binomials are sometimes isocolons (bicolons, tricolons, etc.) which have become set phrases.

They may also be called simply binomials.

With three words, they may be called trinomials, and may satisfy the rule of three in writing.

Common trinomials 

 Abraham, Isaac, and Jacob
 animal, vegetable, or mineral
  back, sack, and crack 
 beans, bullets, and bandages
 beg, borrow, or steal
 bell, book, and candle
 blood, sweat, and tears
 calm, cool, and collected
 Coffee, tea, or me?
 could've, would've, should've
 Eagle, Globe, and Anchor
 bird, ball, and chain
 ear, nose, and throat
 eat, drink, and be merry
 fat, dumb, and happy
 Father, Son, and Holy Ghost
 fear, uncertainty, and doubt
 fraud, waste, and abuse
 friends, Romans, countrymen
 (do not) fold, spindle, or mutilate
 Get it? Got it? Good.
 gold, silver, and bronze
"gold, God, and glory"
 good, bad, and indifferent
 the good, the bad, and the ugly
 Guns, Germs, and Steel
 hand, foot, and mouth
 healthy, wealthy, and wise
 here, there, and everywhere
 hook, line, and sinker
 lather, rinse, repeat
 lie, cheat, or steal
 lights, camera, action
 location, location, location
 win, place, or show
 hop, skip, and a jump
 I came, I saw, I conquered
 (no) ifs, ands, or buts
 judge, jury, and executioner
 left, right and center
 lies, damned lies, and statistics
 life, liberty, and property
 lock, stock, and barrel
 mad, bad, and dangerous
 me, myself, and I
 name, rank, and serial number
 nasty, brutish, and short
 The Niña, the Pinta, and the Santa María
 Planes, Trains, and Automobiles
 (neither) rain, nor sleet, nor snow
 reading, writing and 'rithmetic
 ready, willing, and able
 red, white, and blue
 secure, contain, protect
 sex, drugs, and rock 'n' roll
 Shake, Rattle, and Roll
 short and sweet and to the point
 slips, trips, and falls
 small, medium, and large
 stop, drop, and roll
 stop, look, and listen
 soup, soap, and salvation
 sugar and spice and everything nice
 tall, dark, and handsome
 this, that, and the other
 tic-tac-toe
 Tom, Dick, and Harry
 up, down, and sideways
 (in no) way, shape, or form
 the way, the truth, and the life
 whats, whys, and wherefores
 win, lose, or draw
 [[The New Colossus|your tired, your poor, your huddled masses]]
 Huey, Dewey, and Louie

Quadrinomials 

 attack, decay, sustain, release
 blood, toil, tears, and sweat
 John, Paul, George, and Ringo
 Matthew, Mark, Luke, and John
 soprano, alto, tenor, bass
Suck, squeeze, bang, blow
 War, Pestilence, Famine, Death

See also 

 Anastrophe
 Collocation
 Fossil word
 Hendiadys
 Hendiatris
 Isocolon
 Meme
 Merism
 Phraseme
 Set phrase
 Trope
 Word order
 Adjective order

Notes

References

Bibliography

 Cooper, William E. and Ross, John R. (1975). World order. In Robin E. Grossman et al. (Eds.), Papers from the Parasession on Functionalism, Chicago Linguistic Society, University of Chicago, Chicago, Illinois, pp. 63–111.
 Sarah Bunin Benor, Roger Levy, "The Chicken or the Egg?: A Probabilistic Analysis of English Binomials", Language 82:2:233-278 (June 2006)  full text
 Ourania Hatzidaki, "Binomials and the Computer: a Study in Corpus-Based Phraseology", ALLC/ACH Conference, University of Glasgow, July 2000 abstract

English language
Idioms